Deepak Bhargava is an immigration reform advocate and until 2018 was the executive director of the nonprofit Center for Community Change in Washington, D.C.

Early life
Bhargava was born in Bangalore, India. His family emigrated to the New York City borough, The Bronx, where he grew up and became, in his words, a "ferocious Yankees fan." He attended Harvard College, where he opposed Reserve Officers Training Corps presence, and graduated summa cum laude in 1990.

Advocacy career

Bhargava began his career at ACORN, where he served as legislative director and spokesperson.

He joined the Center for Community Change in 1994 as the director of public policy. In 2000, he directed the National Campaign for Jobs and Income Support coalition of grassroots groups working on federal welfare law. Bhargava became executive director of the Center for Community Change in 2002.

Much of Bhargava's work at CCC has focused on immigration reform. He brought together immigration activists and helped launch the Fair Immigration Reform Movement, was arrested outside of the White House while protesting immigration law in 2011, and was credited for having convinced President Barack Obama to reduce deportation of undocumented immigrants in 2012.

In 2019, Bhargava joined the CUNY School of Labor and Urban Studies as a Distinguished Lecturer of Urban Studies.

Bhargava has served on the boards of:
 Center for Law and Social Policy
 Discount Foundation
 Open Society Foundations
 League of Education Voters
 Bauman Foundation
 National Immigration Forum Action Fund

References
Notes

External links

Living people
Indian emigrants to the United States
Indian gay men
American LGBT people of Asian descent
Harvard College alumni
CUNY School of Labor and Urban Studies faculty
People from Washington, D.C.
American nonprofit executives
1968 births
21st-century Indian LGBT people